BZW may refer to:

Organizations
Barclays de Zoete Wedd, now known as the Barclays Investment Bank
Brabants-Zeeuwse Werkgeversvereniging, Brabant-Zealandic Employers association

Science and technology
Any of two basic leucine zipper and W2 domain-containing proteins (BZW):
BZW1
BZW2
.bzw, file extension used by BZFlag

Other
Blizzard Warning (SAME code BZW), United States weather advisory
Basa-Benue language (ISO code bzw), spoken in central Nigeria
beziehungsweise (abbrev. bzw.), German for respectively or i.e.